Patricia J. Kailola is a noted ichthyologist. Her primary focus is in tropical Indo-Pacific fishes.  She is an Australian Museum Research Associate.  Among her numerous publications are listed several books covering tropical fish.  She also has written texts on catfish.  As of April 2006, she was working on a textbook on Western Indian Ocean fishes.  She has assisted the Australian Museum in confirmation of species identification among their collection.
Worldcat.org lists 27 works in 57 publications in 1 language and 603 library holdings.

Kailola graduated in 1990 from the University of Adelaide with a PhD in zoology titled "The catfish family Ariidae (Teleostei) in New Guinea and Australia: relationships, systematics and zoogeography".

She has been involved in studies of the following fish:
 Himantura 
 Glossolepis  
 Lake Wanam rainbowfish 
 Amissidens hainesi  
 Aspistor 
 Paraplagusia  
 Hortle's whipray  
 Ilisha (genus)  
 Cochlefelis 
 Hemiarius
 Neoarius
 Plicofollis 
 Sciades 
 Paracaesio
 Branchiostegus 
 Ozichthys

See also
:Category:Taxa named by Patricia J. Kailola

References 

 http://www.fishbase.se/Collaborators/CollaboratorSummary.php?ID=93

Australian academics
Australian textbook writers
Women textbook writers
Living people
Women ichthyologists
Australian ichthyologists
Year of birth missing (living people)
Academic staff of the University of the South Pacific

University of Adelaide alumni